Muddy Creek is a stream in Nodaway County in the U.S. state of Missouri. It is a tributary of Nodaway River.

Muddy Creek was so named on account of its usually muddy water.

See also
List of rivers of Missouri

References

Rivers of Nodaway County, Missouri
Rivers of Missouri